Kerrica Hill (born 6 March 2005) is a Jamaican track and field athlete. She won gold medals in the 100 metres hurdles and the 4 x 100 m relay at the 2022 World Under-20 Championships. Prior to this, she had won relay gold at the 2021 World U20 Championships.

Career
Kerrica Hill attended Hydel High School in Jamaica. She was competing for them when she broke the world under-18 best (76.2 cm barriers) for the 100 m hurdles, recording 12.71 seconds at the ISSA/Grace Kennedy Boys and Girls Champs in Kingston in April 2022.

The 17-year-old won two gold medals at the 2022 World Athletics U20 Championships in Cali, Colombia. She triumphed in the 100 m hurdles (senior height barriers) with a time of 12.77 seconds, setting new championship record and her second world U18 best in the process. In addition, she was part of women's 4 x 100 m relay team which broke the world U20 record with 42.59 s to win gold. Hill set in her individual event three of the five fastest U20 times of the season. Speculation followed soon after the championships that she could be about to turn professional.

Personal bests
 60 metres – 7.42 (+0.5 m/s, Kingston] 2022)
 100 metres – 11.16 (+1.2 m/s, Kingston 2022)
 100 m hurdles – 12.77 (+0.2 m/s, Cali 2022) 
 100 m hurdles (76.2 cm) – 12.71 (+0.8 m/s, Kingston 2022)

References

External links
 

 2005 births
Living people
Sportspeople from Kingston, Jamaica
21st-century Jamaican women
Jamaican female hurdlers
World Athletics U20 Championships winners